Social Democratic Labour Party may refer to:

Estonian Social Democratic Labour Party, merged into the Estonian United Left Party
Social Democratic Labour Party of Lithuania, LDDP
Social Democratic Workers' Party (Netherlands)
Social Democratic and Labour Party, Northern Ireland
Russian Social Democratic Labour Party
Social Democratic Labour Party of Trinidad and Tobago
Swedish Social Democratic Party, (Swedish: Sveriges socialdemokratiska arbetareparti, SAP; literally, "Social Democratic Labour Party of Sweden")

See also
Social Democratic Party